The first USS Gwin (Torpedo Boat No. 16/TB-16/YFB-4), was launched 15 November 1897 by the Herreshoff Manufacturing Co., Bristol, Rhode Island, and commissioned at Newport 4 April 1898, Lt, (j.g.) C. S. Williams in command.

She departed Newport 24 June, cruising down the eastern seaboard as far as Florida, thence on patrol off Cuba from 6 to 14 August 1898 as America went to war with Spain. She returned north to Annapolis 31 August and served as cadet training ship for the US Naval Academy until placed in reserve at Norfolk on 10 July 1903.

Gwin remained in reserve until June 1908 when she began assisting in experimental torpedo work out of Newport, Rhode Island. This duty terminated 18 April 1914 when Gwin decommissioned for use as a ferryboat. On 11 April 1918 her name was changed to Cyane, and she was re-classified YFB-4 on 17 July 1920. Her name was struck from the Navy Register 30 April 1925 and she was sold for scrapping 24 September 1925.

References

Additional technical data from

External links

 

Torpedo boats of the United States Navy
Ships built in Bristol, Rhode Island
1897 ships